Der Fall Dr. Wagner is an East German film directed by Carl Balhaus and Harald Mannl. It was released in 1954.

Cast
 Harald Mannl as Dr. Kurt Wagner
 Johanna Endemann as Rita Wagner
 Brigitte Hecht as Inge Wagner
 Dieter Heusinger as Hans Henning
 Hans Wehrl as Gerhard Scholz
 Hans-Peter Thielen as Rudolf Neumann
 Raimund Schelcher as Erich Rückert
 Theo Shall as Rolling
 Wolf Kaiser as Feder
 Peter-Paul Göst as Angehöriger der Sicherheitsorgane
 Horst Preusker as VP-Kommandeur
 Werner Berndt as Karlchen Schneider

External links
 

1954 films
East German films
1950s German-language films
German black-and-white films
1950s German films